The 2021 NAPA Auto Parts 150 was a ARCA Menards Series West race held on August 21, 2021. It was contested over 153-- extended from 150 laps due to an overtime finish  -- laps on the  short track oval. It was the fifth race of the 2021 ARCA Menards Series West season. Bill McAnally Racing driver Jesse Love, collected his second win of the season.

Background

Entry list 

 (R) denotes rookie driver.
 (i) denotes driver who is ineligible for series driver points.

Practice/Qualifying 
Practice and qualifying were combined into one single session, where the fastest recorded lap counts as a qualifying lap.

Starting Lineups

Race

Race results

References 

2021 in sports in California
NAPA Auto Parts 150
2021 ARCA Menards Series West